Veronika Vrecionová (born 8 September 1965) is a Czech politician who was elected as a Member of the European Parliament in 2019.

References

1965 births
Living people
MEPs for the Czech Republic 2019–2024
Civic Democratic Party (Czech Republic) MEPs
Civic Democratic Party (Czech Republic) MPs
Women MEPs for the Czech Republic
Civic Democratic Party (Czech Republic) mayors
Members of the Chamber of Deputies of the Czech Republic (2017–2021)
Politicians from České Budějovice
Prague University of Economics and Business alumni
Women mayors of places in the Czech Republic